Atanda Ganiyu Musa (born 3 February 1960) is a Nigerian table tennis player. He represented Nigeria at two Summer Olympics in 1988 and 1992, taking part in both the singles and doubles events. He was once ranked 20th in the world at his peak.

In 1982, he won the table tennis singles event at the Commonwealth Table Tennis Championships (in Brisbane, Queensland, Australia), before partnering with Sunday Eboh to take the doubles gold in the same discipline.

Along with Francis Sule, Atanda, again, won the table tennis doubles gold medal at the 1985 Commonwealth Games. He achieved a clean sweep of gold in each of the singles, men's doubles and mixed doubles events representing Nigeria at the 1987 All-Africa Games and then, in 1991, with Bose Kaffo as partner, he won the Commonwealth Games' Mixed Doubles event for table tennis.

Arguably one of the best table tennis players to contest out of Africa, Musa's backhand play, and the loop associated with it remains his pièce de résistance. He played in various countries and locations and during his best years in Alicante, Spain.

Besides playing, the 10-time African Men's Table Tennis Singles Champion, has always liked coaching.  
In 1992 he became a full-time coach in Saudi Arabia for three years. In 1995 he was hired to coach in Qatar at the Ali club. In 1997 he returned to Nigeria, where he continued to play and coach before moving permanently to the US. 

Atanda Ganiyu Musa has coached various notable individuals, including celebrities such as Susan Sarandon, Drew Barrymore and Nancy Pelosi, in addition to his successful coaching career. Musa's coaching style emphasizes hard work, discipline, and dedication, with a focus on developing players' skills and helping them reach their full potential. He currently resides in New York City where he coaches in his spare time at SPIN.

References

External links
 
 

1960 births
Living people
Olympic table tennis players of Nigeria
Nigerian male table tennis players
Table tennis players at the 1988 Summer Olympics
Table tennis players at the 1992 Summer Olympics